Abul Kalam Azad (born 5 March 1947) was a former Bangladeshi politician of the Jamaat-e-Islami, televangelist and convicted war criminal of the Bangladesh liberation war.

He was the first of nine prominent Jamaat-e-Islami members accused of war crimes by the International Crimes Tribunal-2 of Bangladesh to be convicted for crimes against humanity, including murder and rape. On 21 January 2013 Azad was sentenced to death by hanging for his crimes.

Early life 
Abul Kalam Azad was born on 5 March 1947 to an impoverished farmer, Abdus Salam Mia and his wife of Barakhardia village, under Saltha Police Station of Faridpur District. After attending a qawmi madrasa, he was a student at Rajendra College in Faridpur.

Career

Social activism
In the 1980s Azad became a regular speaker at a major mosque in Dhaka. He also led an Islamic charity.
In 1999, he founded the MACCA, a social charity. Reflecting on its activities he said "We strongly believe that religion and development should work together to help people. We believe development work is only sustainable through religion; otherwise sustainable development is impossible." As part of his social activism, he involved MACCA in an awareness campaign against AIDS.

Televangelism
He anchored a TV show called Apnar Jiggasa (আপনার জিজ্ঞাসা), or Your Questions on a private TV channel in Bangladesh for several years before the trial.

Controversy

Bangladesh Liberation War 1971
The investigations alleged that during the Bangladesh Liberation War of 1971, he, then known as "Bachchu", aged 24, was a close associate of Ali Ahsan Mohammad Mojaheed, then president of the East Pakistan Islami Chhatra Sangha, the student wing of the Jamaat-e-Islami. The prosecution alleged that before the formation of the Razakar paramilitary force, Azad actively aided the Pakistani army in committing criminal acts.

The prosecution alleged that Azad had assisted the Pakistani military as the chief of the Al-Badr force in Faridpur; the members of the force were young men mostly drawn from colleges. He could speak Urdu well because he had studied in a madrasa. As a close associate of the Pakistani army, he participated in committing atrocities on civilians, including the Hindu community and pro-liberation Bengali people. His defence counsel calls these allegations "false."

In absentia trial

In 2010 the Bangladesh government established the International Crimes Tribunal under a 1973 act of Parliament. It has indicted nine suspects who are prominent Jamaat-e-Islami leaders, and two who are Bangladesh National Party leaders. The government was responding to popular support to have the trials and settle longstanding accusations dating to the liberation war of 1971.

The trial was held in absentia because Azad went into hiding hours before Tribunal-2 issued an arrest warrant against him on 3 April 2012. He is believed to have fled to India or Pakistan. The court appointed a defence attorney for him, Supreme Court lawyer Abdus Sukur Khan.

Azad was indicted on eight counts for murder, rape and genocide. Investigators alleged that they had identified 14 people murdered by Bachchu: three were women he had raped and nine were other abducted civilians. Testimony was offered by 22 prosecution witnesses, including friends and families of the victims. The prosecution said that Bachchu had burnt down at least five houses, looted 15, and forced at least nine Hindus to convert to Islam.

In January 2013, his trial was the first to be completed; he was convicted of war crimes, on six of eight counts, including murder of unarmed civilians and rape committed during the War. On 21 January 2013 Azad was sentenced to the death penalty.

Current status
Abul Kalam Azad is currently believed to have fled to India or Pakistan. MACCA, the organisation founded by him, has disavowed him.

References

Living people
Bangladesh Jamaat-e-Islami politicians
Bangladeshi people convicted of war crimes
Bangladeshi prisoners sentenced to death
Prisoners sentenced to death by Bangladesh
People sentenced to death in absentia
Bangladeshi people convicted of crimes against humanity
1947 births
Sunni Muslim scholars of Islam
Bangladeshi Sunni Muslim scholars of Islam